Eve Elizabeth Slater (born May 16, 1945) is an American physician who served as the United States Assistant Secretary for Health and Human Services under President George W. Bush from 2002 to 2003. Slater received her B.A (magna cum laude, Phi Beta Kappa) from Vassar College in 1967 and M.D. (Alpha Omega Alpha) from the Columbia University College of Physicians and Surgeons in 1971. She completed residency in internal medicine and fellowship in cardiology at the Massachusetts General Hospital, Boston, MA.In 1976, she was appointed the Chief Resident in Medicine at Massachusetts General Hospital, the first woman to appointed to this position. Dr. Slater is currently Professor of Clinical Medicine at Columbia Vagelos College of Physicians and Surgeons (P&S), where she has taught for over 35 years. She is board certified in internal medicine and cardiology and a fellow of the American College of Cardiology.(FACC). At MGH, she led the Hypertension Unit, as Assistant Professor of Medicine. Harvard Medical School.

She has been Senior Vice President, Worldwide Policy, Pfizer. Prior to that, she served as Assistant Secretary for Health in the U.S. Department of Health and Human Services, and spent over 19 years with Merck and Co., as Senior Vice President of Clinical and Regulatory Development, and SVP of External Policy. Many of Merck’s drugs, including statins, vaccines, and HIV/AIDS medicines received worldwide regulatory approval during her tenure. She was also responsible for the Merck Manuals and OTC programs with Johnson & Johnson. She was a member of the U.S. Keystone National Policy Dialogue on HIV, and the NIH Office of AIDS Research Advisory Council. As Assistant Secretary for Health (2001-3), she was the first woman to hold this Senate-confirmed position, with special contributions in women’s health, biosecurity, and electronic health record standards.

She has received the Virginia Kneeland Frantz Distinguished Women in Medicine Award from P&S, the Chairman’s Award from Merck, and was selected to the National Library of Medicine “Changing the Face of Medicine: Celebrating America’s Women Physicians”. She currently serves or has served on the Boards of several non-profit and biotech organizations, including Stealth BioTherapeutics, Vassar College, NEHI (Network for Excellence in Health Innovation), ACRES (Alliance for Clinical Research Excellence and Safety), the Rockefeller University Council, the New England Conservatory of Music President’s Advisory Council, Vertex Pharmaceuticals, Theravance, AnorMed, Idera Pharmaceuticals, Phase Forward and VaxGen. An amateur flutist, she has appeared as soloist with Arthur Fiedler and the Boston Pops.

References

1945 births
Columbia University Vagelos College of Physicians and Surgeons alumni
Living people
People from West Orange, New Jersey
Physicians from Massachusetts
Vassar College alumni